Hlynur Andrésson (born 16 September 1993) is an Icelandic long-distance runner. In 2020, he competed in the men's race at the 2020 World Athletics Half Marathon Championships held in Gdynia, Poland.

In 2019, he won the gold medal in the men's 3000 metre steeplechase event at the 2019 Games of the Small States of Europe held Budva, Montenegro. He also won the silver medal in the men's 5000 metre event.

References

External links 
 

Living people
1993 births
Place of birth missing (living people)
Icelandic male middle-distance runners
Icelandic male long-distance runners
Icelandic male steeplechase runners